Oleh Ivanovych Kulinich (born 25 November 1966) is a Ukrainian politician currently serving as a People's Deputy of Ukraine in the 9th Ukrainian Verkhovna Rada (parliament), having previously served in the 7th and 8th convocations. He is head of the Dovira parliamentary faction in the Verkhovna Rada.

Education 
He studied at the Commodity Faculty of the Poltava Cooperative Institute (now Poltava University of Economics and Trade) where he graduated in 1991.

Career 
After his graduation in 1984, he worked as a driver in the collective farm named after Engels of Zinkiv Raion, Poltava Oblast. He served in the army from November 1984 to 1986.

From January to August 1987, he worked as a freight forwarder for the delivery of bakery products at the Zinkiv bakery.

After obtaining a higher education in October 1991, he worked as the deputy head of the Zheleznogorsk district consumer union of the Kursk Oblast of the Russian Federation.

From October 1992 to September 1995, he was deputy director of trade at the commercial enterprise Torgovy Tsentr in the Kursk Oblast of the Russian Federation.

In October 1995, he returned to Ukraine and started his own business – trading in fuel and lubricants in Zinkiv, Poltava Oblast. Built two gas stations. In 2012, he sold off his business.

In December 2001, he founded an agricultural private limited company "Oktan" of the Zinkiv Raion of the Poltava Oblast. The enterprise is engaged in the cultivation and sale of plant products, as well as animal husbandry. Since 2012, the enterprise has been transferred to management.

Political career 
In March 2002, he was first elected a deputy of the Poltava Oblast Council. In the Poltava Oblast Council of the IV convocation, he joined the permanent commission on investment, construction, housing and communal services and ecology.

In March 2006, he was re-elected to the regional council for a second term, where he worked in the permanent committee on budget, entrepreneurship and property management.

In 2010, he became a deputy of the Poltava Oblast Council for the third time. In the regional council of the 6th convocation, he joined the permanent commission on fuel and energy complex and subsoil use, and was elected its secretary.

In the 2012 parliamentary election he was elected as a People's Deputy of Ukraine of the 7th convocation in electoral district No. 147 (the city of Myrhorod, Dykanka, Zinkiv, Myrhorod , Reshetylivka, Shyshaky raions of the Poltava Oblast) as a non-party candidate with a result of 43.32%. In this connection, he prematurely terminated his duties as a deputy of the regional council. In December 2012, he joined the Party of Regions faction and became a member of the Committee of the Verkhovna Rada of Ukraine on Agrarian Policy and Land Relations.

In the 2014 parliamentary election he was elected as a People's Deputy of Ukraine for single-mandate electoral district No. 147 as a self-nominator. He won 21.19% of the vote.

In the 2019 parliamentary election, he was elected a People's Deputy for the 147th electoral district for the third time with the result of 37.79% of the votes.

In the Parliament of the VII and VIII convocations he is a member of the VRU Committee on Agrarian Policy and Land Relations.

In May 2016 he was appointed chairman of the subcommittee on land relations of the Committee of the Verkhovna Rada of Ukraine on agrarian policy and land relations.

In the Parliament of the IX convocation he joined the Committee on Finance, Tax and Customs Policy.

In different years he was a member of groups on inter-parliamentary relations with the following countries: with the Czech Republic (2019), with Hungary (2020), with the United Arab Emirates, with the China (2020), with Romania (2020), with the Tunisia (2021).

Kulinich is the head of the "Dovira" parliamentary group.

On 26 December 2018 the Russian Federation included Oleg in the sanctions list.

Legislative activity 
Author of laws and draft laws:

 Law on granting powers to notaries to register land lease rights
 Law on land auctions
 Law on Lands of Deceased Heritage
 Law on Land Consolidation

The author of the anti-raider draft law in the land sector, advocated land decentralization and the transfer of land management outside settlements to local communities.

Author and co-author of laws on deregulation in the agro-industrial sector, on requirements for organic production, on the transfer of part of the rent from oil and gas production to local budgets, a number of laws aimed at supporting farming, harmonization of Ukrainian legislation with EU legislation, optimization of tax legislation, safety and quality food products.

Ratings 
As of 8 February 2017, submitted the largest number of amendments that were approved by the Agrarian Committee.

In the 8th session of the Verkhovna Rada, Kulinich took the 8th place among the ten most effective deputies. He initiated 2 of his own draft laws and 4 co-authored ones, which were adopted.

In the ranking of the 100 most influential Ukrainians of 2020 according to the version of the magazine "Focus", he was in 25th place.

He speaks the most and most often in the Verkhovna Rada of all the majority MPs who represent Poltava Oblast in the parliament.

According to the analysis of the work of the Parliament in 2020 by the civil network "Opora", Kulinich demonstrated the highest indicators of participation in the votes of the council.

Criticism 
In past convocations of the Verkhovna Rada, he was seen several times for impersonal voting.

He was one of the 59 deputies who signed the petition, on the basis of which the Constitutional Court of Ukraine canceled the article of the Criminal Code of Ukraine on illegal enrichment, which obliged civil servants to give explanations about the sources of their income and the income of their family members. Criminal liability for illegal enrichment was introduced in Ukraine in 2015. This was one of the requirements of the EU for the implementation of the Visa Liberalization Action Plan, as well as one of Ukraine's obligations to the IMF, established by a memorandum.

With the assistance of Kulinich, a free concert of the band "TiK" took place in the village of Dykanka, Poltava region, during the election campaign to the Verkhovna Rada. During the election campaign, Kulinich opened 15 playgrounds on the territory of the 147th electoral district (Poltava region), built at his own expense.

He was mentioned in the list of deputies who did not enter information about their own business in the declarations for 2014.

Charity 
He financed the program for the installation of playgrounds in the settlements of the district, more than 200 playgrounds were installed.

Personal life 
Married. Has a daughter.

External links 

 Parliamentary expressions. Leaders of the factions summed up the results of the year, answering the questions of HB (interview)

References 

Webarchive template wayback links
1966 births
Living people
People from Poltava Oblast
Seventh convocation members of the Verkhovna Rada
Eighth convocation members of the Verkhovna Rada
Ninth convocation members of the Verkhovna Rada